Steckel may refer to:

Adrián Steckel, Mexican businessman
Anita Steckel (1930–2012), American feminist artist known for paintings and photomontages with sexual imagery
Brian Steckel (1968–2005), convicted murderer executed in the U.S. state of Delaware
Dave Steckel (born 1982), American professional ice hockey center
Eric Steckel (born 1990), American blues singer, guitarist, songwriter, and record producer 
Jan Steckel, American writer of poetry, fiction and creative nonfiction
Leonard Steckel (1901–1971), German actor and director of stage and screen
Les Steckel (born 1946), the 3rd head coach of the Minnesota Vikings in 1984
Margret Steckel (born 1934), Luxembourgian writer of German birth
Richard H. Steckel (born 1944), American heterodox economist with a focus on economic history
Roy E. Steckel (1887–1950), Los Angeles Police Department Chief of Police 1929–1933
Wilhelm Steckel (1868–1940), Austrian physician and psychologist, one of Sigmund Freud's earliest followers
William Steckel (1921–2002), former Republican member of the Pennsylvania House of Representatives

See also
Daniel Steckel House, historic home at Bath, Northampton County, Pennsylvania
Troxell-Steckel House, historic home at Egypt, Whitehall Township, Lehigh County, Pennsylvania
Steckel mill, similar to a reversing rolling mill except two coilers are used to feed the material through the mill